The Addiction is a 1995 American vampire horror film directed by Abel Ferrara, starring Lili Taylor, Christopher Walken and Annabella Sciorra. Edie Falco and Kathryn Erbe appear in supporting roles. The film was written by Ferrara's frequent collaborator, Nicholas St John and was filmed in black-and-white. Its plot follows a philosophy graduate student who is turned into a vampire after being bitten by a woman during a chance encounter. After the attack, she begins to develop an addiction for human blood. The film has been considered an allegory about drug addiction and an allegory of the theological concept of sin.

Plot
Kathleen Conklin, an introverted graduate student of philosophy at New York University, is attacked one night by a woman who calls herself "Casanova". She pushes Kathleen into a stairwell, bites her neck and drinks her blood. Kathleen soon develops several traditional symptoms of vampirism such as aversion to daylight and distaste for food. She grows aggressive in demeanor and propositions her dissertation advisor for sex at her apartment, stealing money from his wallet after he falls asleep. Jean, a doctoral candidate in Kathleen's cohort, notices a drastic change in Kathleen's personality.

During finals week in the library, Kathleen meets a female anthropology student. They go to the woman's apartment to study, where Kathleen bites her neck. While the young woman weeps incredulously, Kathleen coldly informs her "My indifference is not the concern here, it's your astonishment that needs studying". Later, Kathleen runs into an acquaintance, who goes by the street name "Black", at a deli. She propositions him for sex and the two leave, but soon attacks him on an empty street and drinks his blood. Later on campus, Kathleen confronts Jean, rambling about the nature of guilt, before proceeding to bite her neck and drink her blood.

While walking on the street, Kathleen meets Peina, a vampire who claims to have almost conquered his addiction and as a result is almost human. For a time, he keeps her in his home, trying to help her overcome hers, recommending that she read William S. Burroughs' Naked Lunch. Later, Kathleen defends her dissertation to a committee and is awarded her Doctorate of Philosophy. At the graduation party, she and Jean feast on the blood of a waitress in a storage closet. Afterwards, she, Jean, Casanova, and the other victims proceed to attack the other attendees in a bloody, chaotic orgy.

Kathleen, having overdosed from the bloody bacchanal and appearing wracked with regret, wanders the streets covered in blood. She ends up in a hospital and asks the nurse to let her die but the nurse refuses. Kathleen decides to commit suicide by asking the nurse to open the curtains. After the nurse leaves, Casanova appears in Kathleen's hospital room, shuts the curtains and quotes R. C. Sproul to her. Next, a Catholic priest visits Kathleen's room and agrees to administer Viaticum. In the final scene, Kathleen visits her own grave in broad daylight. In a voice-over, Kathleen quotes: "self-revelation is annihilation of self".

Cast

 Lili Taylor as Kathleen Conklin
 Christopher Walken as Peina
 Annabella Sciorra as Casanova
 Edie Falco as Jean
 Paul Calderon as Professor
 Fredro Starr as Black
 Kathryn Erbe as Anthropology Student
 Michael Imperioli as Missionary
 Jamel Simmons as Black's Friend
 Robert W. Castle as Narrator / Priest

Production

Concept
According to Abel Ferrara, the characters of Peina and Casanova were originally written as a female and male respectively. When Walken read the script, he thought Peina was a male character and wanted to play the role. As a result, Walken had his way on portraying Peina whereas Casanova was played by Sciorra. Ferrara said in a 2018 interview that he intended the film to be an explicit metaphor for drug addiction; Ferrara had lived with a years-long addiction to heroin, and conceptualized the film as a Catholic redemption tale in which Kathleen, stricken by her lust for blood, accepts her powerlessness and submits to God before being reborn in the conclusion.

Filming
The Addiction was shot on location in Manhattan, in Greenwich Village and on the New York University campus. The sequences inside Peina's home were shot in a loft owned by Julian Schnabel, who allowed Ferrara to film there. Lili Taylor recalled meeting with Ferrara and rehearsing scenes at his apartment during evenings leading up to the shoot. Taylor and co-star Michael Imperioli, whom she was dating at the time, would walk the streets in Manhattan late at night, which Taylor stated helped her get into the mindset of the character.

Analysis
Scholar David Carter interprets The Addiction as a reimagining of the vampire film, in which the vampire's victims submit to being bitten and thus take on bloodlust for themselves

Scholar Tom Pollard interprets the film as a metaphor for drug addiction, which Ferrara has called as the theme of the film. "This plot relies on human willpower to control addiction...  Eventually [Kathleen] achieves the necessary willpower and seemingly triumphs over death after she's reborn as a human". In addition to the thematic parallel to drug addiction noted by several critics and scholars, Slant Magazines Ed Gonzalez considers the film "perhaps the most fabulously serpentine political work of Ferrara’s career, a quivering nexus of AIDS allegory, identity crisis, historical unease, and socio-economic panic". Film scholars Yoram Allon, Del Cullen and Hannah Patterson note the film's preoccupation with religion, salvation and self-destruction, which are recurrent in Ferrara's films and add that it "perfectly illustrates Ferrara's obsession with the collapse of moral order".

Film critic Stephen Hunter interprets the film as a commentary on the world of academe, pointing out Kathleen's transformative disillusion with philosophy as a means of understanding the nature of good versus evil, "She's got a grudge against philosophy, which, in the long run, with all its constructs and rationalizations and insights, has proved somewhat inefficient as salvation".

Release
The Addiction premiered in New York City on October 4, 1995, and opened in Los Angeles two days later, on October 6, 1995. It was distributed in North American markets by October Films, who one month earlier released Nadja, a vampire film also shot in black-and-white and set in New York City.

Home media
The Addiction remained unreleased on DVD in North America throughout the 2000s, though a VHS was released in 1998 by USA Films. In March 2018, Arrow Films announced an upcoming Blu-ray release of the film available in North America and the United Kingdom, which was released on June 26, 2018. The Arrow Blu-ray features a new 4K restoration of the film, and contains contemporary interviews with Taylor, Walken, Ferrara, and composer Joe Delia, as well as an audio commentary with Ferrara, among other features.

Reception

Box office
The Addiction grossed a total of $46,448 during its opening weekend, playing in seven cinemas in the United States, averaging $6,635 per theater. It expanded to a total of 14 theaters before closing on January 11, 1996, concluding its theatrical run with a domestic gross of $307,308.

Critical response
, the film holds a rating of 74% on Rotten Tomatoes based on 31 reviews, with an average rating of 6.4/10. The website's critical consensus reads: "Abel Ferrara's 1995 horror/suspense experiment blends urban vampire adventure with philosophical analysis to create a smart, idiosyncratic and undeniably odd take on the genre."

Kevin Thomas of the Los Angeles Times praised Taylor's performance, and added: "Although Ferrara dares to be intellectual in a manner virtually unique in commercial American cinema, he nevertheless doesn't forget how to entertain in the gory, bravura manner associated with him. Although it undeniably helps, you don't have to know your Heidegger from Hamburger Helper to enjoy The Addiction as a grisly yet unusual thriller of the supernatural." The Washington Posts Hal Hinson was less laudatory of Taylor's performance, writing that she "seems less distinctive here than she has been in past roles." However, he praised Walken's performance, though summarized the film as "serious and passionate; [Ferrara's] conviction, too, is unquestionable. However, when he flashes images of historic atrocities of both the distant and recent past—Nazi death camps, the war dead in Bosnia—his ideas come across as shallow and banal. Also, inserting scenes of real-life horror into what is essentially a glorified genre exercise may strike some as the essence of bad taste." Caryn James of The New York Times expressed a similar sentiment, noting "When the film connects Kathleen's struggle to resist evil to My Lai and the Holocaust, those comparisons are exploitative in a way that even a genre-bending film can't get away with."

Stephen Hunter of The Baltimore Sun praised Taylor for portraying Kathleen "with dour, sexless intensity," and deemed the film "far sexier than Interview with the Vampire and far deadlier than the campy Nadja...  It's extremely disturbing, a graduate- level movie for advanced students in any of three subjects: cinema, philosophy and debauchery."

Accolades
The film was nominated for the Golden Bear award at the 45th Berlin International Film Festival where it won the Blue Angel Award. Lili Taylor won the Sant Jordi Award for Best Foreign Actress. The film received Best Actress (Taylor), Best Film (Abel Ferrara) and Special Mention Award (Walken) at the Málaga International Week of Fantastic Cinema.

The film was nominated for two Independent Spirit Awards and won Critics Award in Mystfest and was also nominated for Best Film. The film received high praise from the critic Peter Bradshaw, who named it as one of his top ten favourite films in a 2002 Sight and Sound poll.

References

Sources

External links
 
 
 
 

1995 films
1995 horror films
1990s English-language films
1990s supernatural horror films
American black-and-white films
American supernatural horror films
American vampire films
Films about academia
Films directed by Abel Ferrara
Films scored by Joe Delia
Films set in New York City
Films shot in New York City
1990s American films